Richard Cuney  or Cuny (died bef. 24 October 1627) was a Welsh politician who sat in the House of Commons from 1604 to 1611.

He was the son of Walter Cuny of Lamphey, Pembrokeshire. As a soldier he was a captain of Foot in the Lisbon expedition of 1589, the Normandy campaign of 1591, in Guernsey in 1593 and in Ireland in 1595, 1597. He was a lieutenant colonel on the Cadiz expedition of 1596 and a full colonel and serjeant-major of the army in Ireland in 1598.

In 1604, he was elected Member of Parliament for Pembroke. He was appointed High Sheriff of Pembrokeshire for 1614–15.

He married twice: firstly Anne, the daughter of Matthew Cradock of Stafford, with whom he had a daughter and secondly Jane, the daughter of Morgan Powell, merchant, of Greenhill, Pembrokeshire, with whom he had a son and 6 daughters. His son was captain Walter Cuney, a Parliamentary officer under Colonel Rowland Laugharne in Pembrokeshire in 1643.

References

 

Year of birth missing
1627 deaths
Place of birth missing
Members of the Parliament of England (pre-1707) for constituencies in Wales
Welsh soldiers
16th-century Welsh military personnel
17th-century Welsh politicians
English MPs 1604–1611
High Sheriffs of Pembrokeshire
English people of the Anglo-Spanish War (1585–1604)
People of Elizabethan Ireland